In mathematics, the Clarke generalized derivatives are types generalized of derivatives that allow for the differentiation of nonsmooth functions. The Clarke derivatives were introduced by Francis Clarke in 1975.

Definitions 

where  denotes the limit supremum.

where  represents an inner product of vectors in 
Note that the Clarke generalized gradient is set-valued—that is, at each  the function value  is a set.

More generally, given a Banach space  and a subset  the Clarke generalized directional derivative and generalized gradients are defined as above for a locally Lipschitz contininuous function

See also 
 Subgradient method — Class of optimization methods for nonsmooth functions.
 Subderivative

References 

 
 

Generalizations of the derivative
Convex optimization